Darulfatwa - Islamic High Council of Australia was established in 2004 by the Association of Islamic Charitable Projects, Australia as an "independent and moderate, symbol of hope for Australian Muslims".  It is supportive of Sufism.

Darulfatwa (also known as Darul-Fatwa or House of Fatwa) provides Fatwas and is associated with a number of Australian Islamic organisations and Muslim schools. including the colocated Salamah College and radio station 2MFM.

Darulfatwa says it, "does not endorse any form of extremist ideology and it opposes any potential spreading of such ideology . .  [and] . . that all acts of evil carried out in the name of Islam should be condemned and countered by all available means".

In 2005, Prime Minister John Howard commended the Darulfatwa - Islamic High Council of Australia for organising an anti-terrorism forum, "Sunnis against Extremism", which was attended by 200 members of the Islamic community. It has also been congratulated within the New South Wales Legislative Assembly for its role as the leading representative for Muslims in Australia.

Darulfatwa does not endorse any form of extremist ideology and it opposes any potential spreading of such ideology within its constituency. Darulfatwa makes the point that all acts of evil carried out in the name of Islam should be condemned and countered by all available means.

See also
2MFM  
Ahlus Sunnah Wal Jamaah Association (Australia)
Australian National Imams Council
Islam in Australia
Islamic organisations in Australia
Islamic schools and branches

References

External links
  Darulfatwa website  
  Associations of Darulfatwa

Islamic organisations based in Australia
Organisations based in Sydney